Mastigotragus is a genus of whip-lash squid containing a single species, Mastigotragus pyrodes. This species was originally placed within Mastigoteuthis, but has been subsequently separated from other species in that genus due to multiple morphological characters. This genus is characterized by a lack of antitragus in the funnel-locking cartilage, larger sucker rings on the tentacles, a particular photophore morphology, and relatively large eyelid photophore. This genus is Latin for 'whip-lash goat'.

The type specimen was collected in the North pacific off the coast of southern California at 33°32'N, 118°23'W Eastern North Pacific since then the species has been recorded in northern Hawaiian waters between latitudes 23°N-28°N.

References

External links

Squid
Cephalopod genera
Taxobox binomials not recognized by IUCN